Maryan's ctenotus (Ctenotus maryani)  is a species of skink found in Western Australia.

References

maryani
Reptiles described in 1998
Taxa named by Kenneth Peter Aplin
Taxa named by Mark Adams (herpetologist)